Siriz (also Romanized as Sīrīz; also known as Sārīz) is a village in Siriz Rural District, Yazdanabad District, Zarand County, Kerman Province, Iran. At the 2006 census, its population was 655, in 173 families.

References 

Populated places in Zarand County